Tuo Tsung-hua (born 10 October 1962) is a Taiwanese actor. He won the 2005 Golden Bell Award for Best Actor.

Selected filmography
Osmanthus Alley (1987)
A Home Too Far (1990)
Zodiac Killers (1991)
18 (1993)
The Day the Sun Turned Cold (1994)
Siao Yu (1995)
The Christ of Nanjing (1995)
Wolves Cry Under the Moon (1997)
July Rhapsody (2002)
The Pawnshop No. 8 (2003)
Island of Fire (2006)
Lust, Caution (2007)
Parking (2008)
The Warrior and the Wolf (2009)
Soul (2013)
Bromance (2015)
First of May (2015)
Godspeed (2016)
Plant Goddess (2018)
  (2020)

References

External links

1962 births
Living people
20th-century Taiwanese male actors
21st-century Taiwanese male actors
Taiwanese male film actors
Taiwanese male television actors
Tujia people
Manchu male actors
Taiwanese people of Manchu descent